Miguel Jaume y Bosch was a Spanish painter who lived most of his life in Montevideo, Uruguay. He was born in 1844 in Palma de Mallorca, Spain, where he studied at the Academia de Bellas Artes.

In 1871 he arrived in Montevideo where he lived until his death on May 18, 1900. He was married to Maria Teresa Bernat. In Uruguay he opened an art studio where he became the teacher of several local painters, among them Pedro Blanes Viale.

In Montevideo he acted as the secretary of Jose Pedro Varela, who was the author of the 1877 Law Of Common Education. In addition, he was the president of a local institution organized to help jobless immigrants from the Balearic Islands.

Many of his paintings are portraits of people from Montevideo and show the people and the streets in the second part of 19th century.

External links
University of the Balearic Islands, "Other significant Balearics in Uruguayan society during the 19th and 20th Centuries"

References
Bernat, Maria Teresa. 1941 Montevideo, Paper on Miguel Jaume y Bosch.

1844 births
1900 deaths
People from Palma de Mallorca
Painters from the Balearic Islands
Spanish expatriates in Uruguay
19th-century Uruguayan painters
Uruguayan male artists
19th-century male artists
Male painters